Everette Harp (born August 17, 1961, in Houston, Texas) is an American jazz saxophonist who has recorded for Blue Note,  Capitol and Shanachie Records. His album Jazz Funk Soul, a collaboration with Chuck Loeb and Jeff Lorber, received his first nomination for a Grammy Award for Best Contemporary Instrumental Album at 57th Annual Grammy Awards.

Career
Everette Harp was the youngest of eight children. His father was a minister and his mother played the organ. Gospel music was one of his earliest influences. He started playing jazz in middle school at Marshall Junior High under the tutelage of drummer Buddy Smith. He attended the High School for Performing and Visual Arts in Houston under the direction of Robert "Doc" Morgan", then North Texas State University as a music major in the early 1980s. While there he joined Phi Beta Sigma. Working as an accountant for a short time, Harp played in local Houston bands, most notably a jazz/funk group called The Franchise which released an album locally with the first recording of Harp's "There's Still Hope" in 1987.

In 1988 he moved to Los Angeles and toured briefly with Teena Marie and then Anita Baker. Two years later George Duke signed him to a contract with Capitol Records to record with his group 101 North. Bruce Lundvall of Blue Note Records signed Harp to a solo contract before the group album was released. Harp's album was produced by Duke and released by Blue Note in 1992.

Harp appeared at the Montreux Jazz Festival as a featured guest artist presented by Duke. He appeared every week on The Arsenio Hall Show. His appearance on Sax by the Fire, produced by John Tesh, led to his performing on the theme song for Entertainment Tonight, produced by and starring Tesh. He also played on the theme song for Soul Train and shared the stage with President Bill Clinton at the Arkansas Ball in 1992.

Harp worked with Stanley Clarke, Natalie Cole, Neil Diamond, Aretha Franklin, Wayne Henderson, Al Jarreau, The Jazz Crusaders, Billy Joel, Chaka Khan, Kenny Loggins, Bobby Lyle, Peter Maffay, Marcus Miller, Chante Moore, Dianne Reeves, Eros Ramazzotti, Brenda Russell, Joe Sample, and Luther Vandross.

He continued his television and studio recording obligations and his solo recording career. During the 1990s he became a staple in the Los Angeles TV and recording studio scene, showing up on many recordings becoming a favorite of such producers as Kenny "Babyface" Edmonds, Peter Wolf, Peter Asher and Barry Eastmond. He appeared on several television shows, including The Tonight Show with Johnny Carson and with Jay Leno, The Arsenio Hall Show, and The Tavis Smiley Show. In later years Harp reduced his side gigs to focus on his solo career.

Harp collaborated with guitarist Chuck Loeb and keyboardist Jeff Lorber and formed a group Jazz Funk Soul. The trio has released two studio albums, Jazz Funk Soul in 2014 and More Serious Business in 2016. Loeb died of cancer on July 31, 2017, at the age of 61.

Discography

Studio albums

Jazz Funk Soul - Collaboration Albums

Other Collaborations
 Marcus Miller ("Under the Sky") (1991)
 Kenny Loggins ("What's Going On") (1997)
 Billy Joel ("Hey Girl") (1997)
 Regina Belle ("Lazy Afternoon") (2004)
 Forever, For Always, For Luther (2004)
 "Wholly Holy"
 Yolanda Adams ("Wholly Holy") (1997)
 Nikkole ("Love Was Made in Heaven") (2009)

References

External links
Official site
Everette Harp at AllMusic
Everette Harp at Discogs

1961 births
Living people
Musicians from Houston
Capitol Records artists
Smooth jazz saxophonists
Blue Note Records artists
Shanachie Records artists
American jazz saxophonists
American male saxophonists
African-American jazz musicians
University of North Texas College of Music alumni
High School for the Performing and Visual Arts alumni
21st-century American saxophonists
Jazz musicians from Texas
21st-century American male musicians
American male jazz musicians
21st-century African-American musicians
20th-century African-American people